Hjörvar Steinn Grétarsson (born 29 May 1993) is an Icelandic chess grandmaster. He is the No. 1 ranked Icelandic player as of May 2021.

Chess career
Born in 1993, Hjörvar earned his FIDE master title in 2011, followed by his International master title in 2012 and Grandmaster title in 2013. He first competed for Iceland at the 39th Chess Olympiad, scoring 4/7. He has since represented his nation at the 40th Chess Olympiad, scoring 6½/10; the 41st Chess Olympiad, scoring 7/10; and the 42nd Chess Olympiad, scoring 7/10.

Grétarsson received a wild card from the Icelandic Chess Federation to compete in the FIDE World Fischer Random Chess Championship 2022.

References

External links

1993 births
Living people
Chess grandmasters
Chess Olympiad competitors
Hjorvar Steinn Gretarsson
Hjorvar Steinn Gretarsson